The 122nd Fighter Escadrille of the Polish Air Force (Polish: 122. Eskadra Myśliwska) was one of the fighter units of the Polish Army in 1939.

History

In September 1939 the 122nd Fighter Escadrille was attached to the Army Krakow.

Crew and equipment

On 1 September 1939 the escadrille had 10 PZL P.11c airplanes. 

The air crew consisted of: 
commanding officer kpt. pil. Mieczysław Wiórkiewicz
his deputy ppor. pil. Edward Pilch

and 13 other pilots:

 ppor. Michał Samoliński
 ppor. Bronisław Skibiński
 ppor. Stanisław Wielgus
 pchor. Władysław Grudziński
 pchor. Franciszek Kozłowski
 pchor. Bolesław Własnowolski
 plut. Władysław Majchrzyk
 plut. Antoni Markiewicz
 kpr. Mieczysław Parafiński
 kpr. Adolf Pietrasiak
 st. szer. Paweł Kowala
 st. szer. Tadeusz Krieger
 st. szer. Edward Uchto

See also
Polish Air Force order of battle in 1939

References
 

Polish Air Force escadrilles